Dinish,, is a small island on the coast of Connemara in County Galway, Ireland.

Geography 

The island is connected to the island of Lettermullen and is part of a group of islands collectively known as Ceantar na nOileán.  The island has no permanent population and is not connected via a bridge, however access is possible via boat or on foot at low tide.

History 
The island has had a permanent population in recent history with a population of nine families in 1911.

Dinish is mentioned in the essay "In Connemara" by John Millington Synge.

It was owned in the 1950's and 1960's by Dr Alfred Thompson Schofield, surgeon and author of "Scientific Diets for African Children" (1936) and a prominent missionary for the Church Missionary Society (Uganda).

References

Islands of County Galway
Gaeltacht places in County Galway